Stagecoach Buckaroo is a 1942 American Western film directed by Ray Taylor and written by Al Martin. The film stars Johnny Mack Brown, Fuzzy Knight, Nell O'Day, Anne Nagel, Herbert Rawlinson and Glenn Strange. The film was released on February 13, 1942, by Universal Pictures.

Plot

Cast         
Johnny Mack Brown as Steve Hardin
Fuzzy Knight as Clem Clemmons
Nell O'Day as Molly Denton
Anne Nagel as Nina Kincaid
Herbert Rawlinson as Bill Kincaid
Glenn Strange as Breck Braddock
Henry Hall as Joseph Denton
Ernie Adams as Blinky
Lloyd Ingraham as Ezra Simpson
Frank Brownlee as Higgins
Jack C. Smith as Sheriff
Harry Tenbrook as Slatz
Blackie Whiteford as Hogan

References

External links
 

1942 films
American Western (genre) films
1942 Western (genre) films
Universal Pictures films
Films directed by Ray Taylor
American black-and-white films
1940s English-language films
1940s American films